Inadequate People 2 is a 2020 Russian romantic comedy-drama film directed by Roman Karimov, a sequel to the 2010 film Inadequate People. 

It was theatrically released in Russia on December 10, 2020 by MEGOGO Studios.

Plot 
Christina lives with Vitaly, but their views on the world do not coincide. She devotes a lot of time to household chores, while he, meanwhile, is more and more at work, especially after a new assistant appeared in his office.

Cast

References 

2020 films
2020s Russian-language films
2020 romantic comedy-drama films
Russian romantic comedy-drama films
Russian sequel films
Films directed by Roman Karimov